Methuselah was an English rock, founded and active in the 1960s.

Overview
The line-up included Mick Bradley (drums), who came from The Sorrows and left to join Steamhammer in 1969. John Gladwin and Terry Wincott were school friends from Scunthorpe.

The origins of the band were in two earlier 1960s bands, The Dimples and Gospel Garden. The group renamed itself to Methuselah. Influences included folk music and gospel music. The band were signed to Elektra Records in the late 1960s, with a three-LP contract.
John Gladwin and Terry Wincott were later in the folkband Amazing Blondel.

Members
The quintet consisted of:

 Craig Austin – bass, vocals
 Mick Bradley – drums (died 1972)
 John Gladwin – vocals, vibes
 Les Nicol – guitar, vocals
 Terry Wincott – guitar, vocals

Discography
Albums
 Methuselah (1969)
 Matthew Mark Luke & John (1969, unreleased)

References

External links
 Methuselah – Fireball Woman (1969, UK) on YouTube

1960s establishments in England
1969 disestablishments in England
Musical groups established in the 1960s
Musical groups disestablished in 1969
British folk rock groups
English Christian rock groups